Chiang Wan-an (born 26 December 1978), also known as Wayne Chiang, is a Taiwanese politician who has served as the mayor of Taipei since December 2022. He is the son of former Vice Premier John Chiang, and is believed to be a great-grandson of former President of the Republic of China Chiang Kai-shek. He is the youngest mayor of Taipei since the appointment of Chang Feng-hsu.

Upon graduation from National Chengchi University and the University of Pennsylvania, Chiang worked as a corporate lawyer in the United States before returning to Taiwan for politics.

Early life 
Born Chang Wan-an on 26 December 1978, he is the only son to his parents Chiang Hsiao-yen and Helen Huang. He has two elder sisters.

He was unaware of his relation to Chiang Kai-shek until high school, when his father claimed to be an illegitimate son of Chiang Ching-kuo making Chiang Kai-Shek a great-grandfather of the high schooler. Following the announcement, the family changed their surname from "Chang" to "Chiang".

Chiang was a student at the Affiliated Senior High School of National Taiwan Normal University and Taipei Municipal Jianguo High School. Upon graduation, he attended National Chengchi University where he majored in double bachelor of diplomacy and law.

Legal career
Upon graduation from National Chengchi University,  he worked for the law firm Lee and Li. Later, Chiang became an aide in the National Assembly. He was accepted to the University of Pennsylvania Law School in 2002, and left for the United States. After Chiang earned his J.D. degree, he practiced law at Wilson Sonsini Goodrich & Rosati's Palo Alto office, a well known corporate law firm in California where his practice area focused on venture capital financing and corporate and security law.  After practicing for several years, he founded his own law firm before returning to Taiwan in 2013.

Political career
Chiang faced Lo Shu-lei in the first round of the Kuomintang party primary in April 2015. After Lo failed to build a sufficient lead, another primary was called the next month, which Chiang won. He ran as the KMT candidate for Taipei City's third constituency in the 2016 legislative elections and won a seat in the Legislative Yuan. The Taipei District Prosecutor's Office ended an investigation of vote-buying accusations against Chiang in March, but did not charge him with wrongdoing.

In January 2018, Chiang stated that he would not seek to represent the Kuomintang in the Taipei mayoral election scheduled for November. Chiang ran for reelection in 2020, defeating his closest opponent, Democratic Progressive Party candidate Enoch Wu, by six percent of votes, 51–45%. In May 2022, the Kuomintang nominated Chiang as its candidate for the Taipei mayoralty in the local elections. On 10 November 2022, Chiang announced he would resign his legislative seat to focus on his mayoral campaign. A by-election for Chiang's legislative constituency was scheduled for 8 January 2023. On 26 November 2022, he was elected as the Mayor of Taipei. Upon taking office on 25 December 2022, Chiang became the youngest-ever Mayor of Taipei.

2022 Taipei mayoral election

Election result

Personal life 
Chiang met his future wife, Shih Fang-hsuan (石舫亘), while both were students at National Chengchi University. They dated for ten years and married on 23 May 2009. Their first child, a son named Chiang Te-li (蔣得立), was born in June 2011, and their second son, Chiang Te-yu (蔣得宇), was born on 23 July 2021. In January 2023, they welcomed their third son.

References

External links

1978 births
Living people
Mayors of Taipei
Wan-an
21st-century Taiwanese lawyers
Members of the 9th Legislative Yuan
Kuomintang Members of the Legislative Yuan in Taiwan
Taipei Members of the Legislative Yuan
National Chengchi University alumni
University of Pennsylvania Law School alumni
Affiliated Senior High School of National Taiwan Normal University alumni
Taiwanese expatriates in the United States
Members of the 10th Legislative Yuan